TUC: The Lighter Side of Life is a talk show for famous celebrities  presented by TUC Pakistan. This show is centered on the guest’s personal life, careers and relationship with the paparazzi amongst several others, allowing viewers to receive casual and light-hearted insights into the lives of their favorite celebrities. First episode of season 1 was aired on Hum TV hosted by Mahira Khan on 14 December 2013 starring Ali Zafar as a guest while the last episode of season was aired on 8 March 2014 in which Fawad Khan appeared as a guest.

Overview 
The Lighter Side of Life is the production of 7th Sky Entertainment. The show airs every Saturday at 9:10 pm exclusively on Hum TV. Other media partners are PTV Home, A-Plus and Apna TV. Different guests are invited who may be actors, singers or even cricketers and interviewed about their personal life while keeping the mode of show light. Mahira makes this show interesting by asking the guest to act out a scene, by making them sing and having a segment known as turqi ba turqi in which guests have to answer rapidly and later there is a picture segment where the guest have to say the first thing flashing in their mind after the respective picture is displayed.

Guests 
The guest list of season 1 includes Shoaib Akhtar, Bushra Ansari, Zeba Bakhtiar, Hareem Sheikh, Saba Hameed, Shehreyar and Adeel, Ali Azmat, Shoaib Malik, Fawad Khan, Ali Zafar,  Javed Shaikh, Sanam Saeed, Ayesha Omer and a lot more.

Season 1

References

External links 
 

2013 Pakistani television series debuts
Hum TV original programming